The Men's 15 kilometre freestyle competition at the FIS Nordic World Ski Championships 2023 was held on 22 February and 1 March 2023.

Results

Final
The race was staretd at 12:30.

Qualification
The qualification was started on 22 February at 13:30.

References

Men's 15 kilometre freestyle